The Pace-Finletter MOU of 1952 was a memorandum of understanding (MOU) signed on 4 November 1952 between Secretary of the Air Force Thomas K. Finletter and Secretary of the Army Frank Pace that removed the weight restrictions on helicopters that the United States Army could use. It also widened the range of tasks the Army's helicopters could be used for. However, it also created an arbitrary 5,000 pound weight restriction limit on the Army's ability to fly fixed-wing aircraft. As a result, the U.S. Army today is dependent upon the United States Air Force to purchase and man fixed-wing ground-attack aircraft to fulfill close air support missions. 
"...that established a fixed wing weight limit (for the Army) of five thousand pounds empty, but weight restrictions on helicopters were eliminated ..."

Background
One of the consequences of President Harry S Truman creating the Department of Defense was the splitting off of the U.S. Army Air Forces (the U.S. Army Air Corps was disestablished in 1942) from the U.S. Army, and creating the U.S. Air Force. With the Air Force's natural inclination towards Air Superiority and Strategic (i.e. nuclear) priorities, the Army wanted air capabilities of its own. However, this would mean the duplication of some resources between the Army and Air Force. Eventually there was a meeting between Air Force Secretary Thomas K. Finletter and Army Secretary Frank Pace resulted in the Pace-Finletter MOU of 4 November 1952.

The previous Agreement of 2 October 1951 that was not able to resolve issues as the 4 November 1952 MOU did.

This MOU built upon the Key West Agreement.

The agreement
The agreement read:

Consequences
Some people credit this agreement for freeing the Army to develop the helicopter-based United States Army Aviation Branch established in 1983. From 1942 until 1983, Army Aviation assets were controlled by "proponent branches" based on aircraft and unit type. Beginning in 1942, when the Army Air Corps was re-designated as the Army Air Forces, light, single-engine airplanes were retained by the Army Ground Forces, and designated as "liaison" aircraft assigned to artillery units. As helicopters were introduced into Army aviation, cargo helicopters became under the proponency of the Transportation Corps, and eventually there were units of assault helicopters (Infantry Branch), attack helicopters and observation/scout helicopters (Armor Branch), "aerial rocket artillery" attack helicopters (Field Artillery Branch), observation/reconnaissance airplanes (Military Intelligence Branch), aerial medical evacuation units (Medical Service Corps), and signals/electronic intelligence airplanes (Signal Corps).

Prior to 1983 potential Army Aviators were commissioned into a "basic branch" (i.e., Infantry Armor, Field Artillery, etc.), completed that branches' officer basic course, and subsequently requested orders to flight training (usually after at least one year of "branch qualifying" service in a unit of that basic branch). Upon designation as an Army Aviator, the new pilot was usually assigned to a unit under his "owning" branches' proponency, completed any required aircraft transition training, and began his service in Army Aviation. Warrant officer aviators were appointed into the Army "at large" (i.e., without specific branch designation). However, the career management was under the cognizance of the Army Warrant Officer Aviation Branch, which was a purely administrative branch with no distinctive branch insignia, aircraft or tactical units under its proponency. (until 2004 all Army warrant officers wore the Warrant Officer Branch insignia of a spread eagle and wreath design).

Other people blame this agreement for allowing the Air Force to ignore the needs of ground attack support, other than the Fairchild Republic A-10 Thunderbolt II.

The Air Force had tried to retire and/or transfer to the Reserves its entire A-10 fleet, replacing them with the General Dynamics F-16 Fighting Falcon, just before the First Gulf War. The First Gulf War proved the value of the A-10 in the close air support role, while also showing the limitations of the F-16 as a CAS aircraft.

See also
 Attack aircraft
 Close air support
 Johnson-McConnell agreement of 1966
 Key West Agreement of 1948

References

United States documents
Aviation Branch
November 1952 events in the United States
1952 in the United States
20th-century military history of the United States